Kışla is a village in Uşak Province, Turkey.

Its population was 773 as of 2010.

There are some Lydian ruins around Kışla. But there is no written document about the ancient history of the village . The oldest mosque in the village was built around 1730s. Probably the Turkmens used the village as a winter settlement and named it Kışlak meaning winter settlement of the nomads. The village was declared a belde by establishing a municipality in 1999. But in 2014 the municipality was disestablished.

References

Villages in Uşak Province
Ulubey District